Bevil Milton "Barney" Glover  is the Vice-Chancellor and President of Western Sydney University.

Personal life 

Glover was educated at Newcomb High School, Victoria. He later studied mathematics at the University of Melbourne, receiving a PhD in 1993.

Career 

Glover began his executive career at the University of Ballarat, where he was appointed the Director, Research and Graduate Studies in 1990. In 1997 he moved to Curtin University as the Director, Research and Development, before being appointed Pro-Vice Chancellor Research and Development.  In 2006 Professor Glover became the Deputy Vice-Chancellor of Research at the University of Newcastle.

In 2009, Glover became the Vice-Chancellor of Charles Darwin University. He  began his term as Vice-Chancellor of Western Sydney University in January 2014.

In 2015, Glover was elected unopposed as the Chair of Universities Australia, the peak body representing the Australian university sector nationally and internationally.

Glover is the Australian Government representative on the University of the South Pacific University Grants Committee.

Glover is a board member of the Museum of Applied Arts and Science Trust, and Education Services Australia.

Glover was the Chair of Innovative Research Universities. He is currently the Chair of Rare Voices Australia, a not-for profit organisation established to advocate for Australians living with a rare disease.

In 2016, Glover was nominated for the Bent Spoon award. An unsuccessful attempt was made by a colleague to remove this nomination.

Elected a Fellow of the Royal Society of New South Wales (Est. 1821) in 2017 and gazetted as such in the NSW Government Gazette by the then Governor His Excellency the Honourable David Hurley AC DSC(Rtd) February 2018.

References

External links 

 

1958 births
Living people
University of Melbourne alumni
Academic staff of Western Sydney University
Vice-Chancellors of Western Sydney University
Fellows of the Australian Academy of Technological Sciences and Engineering
Officers of the Order of Australia